The 1995 IBM OS/2 Fiesta Bowl, played on January 2, 1995, was the 24th edition of the Fiesta Bowl. The game featured the Colorado Buffaloes and Notre Dame Fighting Irish.

1st half
Colorado kicker, Neil Voskeritchian, started the scoring with a 33-yard field goal in the first quarter, to give the Buffaloes the early 3–0 lead. Later in the 1st quarter, quarterback Kordell Stewart tossed a 1-yard pass to Christian Fauria for a touchdown, and a 10–0 Colorado lead. Scott Cengia got Notre Dame on the board with a 29-yard field goal to make it 10–3.

In the second quarter Colorado sealed its win, by scoring three consecutive touchdowns. Kordell Stewart started by rushing 9 yards for a touchdown, then Rashaan Salaam scored two 1-yard touchdown runs to increase the lead to 31–3. Ron Powlus threw a 9-yard touchdown pass to Derrick Mayes to cut the lead to 31–10 before halftime.

2nd half
Powlus threw a 40-yard touchdown pass to Mayes to cut the lead to 31–17, early in the third quarter. Then Voskeritchian kicked a 48-yard field goal to extend Colorado's lead to 34–17. Rashaan Salaam put the exclamation mark on the game with a 5-yard touchdown run, increasing Colorado's lead to 41–17. Notre Dame scored one last time on a 7-yard pass from Powlus to Leon Wallace to provide the final margin.

References

External links
 Bowl Championship Series – 1995 – Colorado 41, Notre Dame 24

Fiesta Bowl
Fiesta Bowl
Colorado Buffaloes football bowl games
Notre Dame Fighting Irish football bowl games
Bowl Coalition
Fiesta Bowl
Fiesta Bowl